The Church of St. Augustine is a Roman Catholic parish church located in Forest, a municipality of Brussels, Belgium. It is dedicated to Saint Augustine.

Designed by the architects Léon Guiannotte and André Watteyne in Art Deco style, and built between 1932 and 1935, it is one of three major churches in Brussels made of reinforced concrete (the other two are the Basilica of the Sacred Heart in Koekelberg and the Church of St. John the Baptist in Molenbeek). The building received protected status on 8 August 1988.

The church is located on the / (a square named due to its altitude one hundred meters above sea level), not far from Duden Park and the /. This site is served by the bus and tram stop / (on lines 48, 51 and 70).

See also

 List of churches in Brussels
 Roman Catholicism in Belgium
 Art Deco in Brussels
 History of Brussels

Further reading
 Christian Carez, Bruxelles Art Déco: 1920-1930 (Brussels, 1996), p. 61.
 Gilles Queille, "Église Saint-Augustin, Place de l'Altitude 100, à Forest. Architectes L. Guiannotte et Watteyne", Bâtir. Revue mensuelle illustrée d'Architecture, d'Art et de Décoration, 40 (1936), 592–593.

References

Notes

Roman Catholic churches in Brussels
Forest, Belgium
Protected heritage sites in Brussels
Art Deco architecture in Belgium